The 2020 Formula Regional Americas Championship powered by Honda was the third season for the FIA Formula 3 regional series across North America. The series was sanctioned by SCCA Pro Racing, the professional racing division of the Sports Car Club of America. The 2020 season was first season under the moniker of Formula Regional Americas, after a rebranding to align with the FIA single-seater development pathway. Linus Lundqvist won the championship, finishing 118 points in front of runner-up David Malukas, meanwhile Global Racing Group dominated the team's championship.

Teams and drivers 
Relentless Motorsports were the first Canadian-based team to compete in the series.  All drivers competed with Honda-powered Ligier JS F3 cars on Hankook tires.

Race calendar 
The series schedule was announced on 19 December 2019. However, after multiple postponements and cancellations due to the COVID-19 pandemic, a revised calendar was announced on 29 May 2020. This new calendar includes new rounds at Mid-Ohio Sports Car Course and Miami Speedway. The round at Circuit Trois-Rivières in Quebec, Canada - the planned first international event for the series - was not included in the reworked calendar.  The round at Circuit of the Americas was held as a triple-header to finish out the season.

Championship standings

Points are awarded as follows:

Drivers' standings

Teams' Championship
Only a team's two best finishing cars are eligible for teams' championship points.

Notes

References

External links 
 Official website: 

Formula Regional Americas Championship
Formula Regional Americas Championship
Formula Regional Americas Championship
Regional Americas Championship